El Chupacabra is an EP by American rock band SOiL. The name of the EP refers to a mythical Puerto Rican beast, and literally means "goat-sucker" in Spanish. Songs from the EP later appeared on Soil's first album, Throttle Junkies.

Track listing
"F-Hole" – 2:55
"Broken Wings" – 4:15
"Crucified" – 4:31
"She" – 3:28
"Two Cent Friend" – 3:53

Personnel 
 Ryan McCombs – vocals
 Adam Zadel – guitar, backing vocals
 Shaun Glass – guitar
 Tim King – bass guitar
 Tom Schofield – drums

References

1998 EPs
Soil (American band) albums
Heavy metal EPs